Dana Hanley is an American politician, attorney and jurist from Maine. He has served as the Judge Probate of Oxford County, Maine since January 1, 1997. He served in the Maine House of Representatives from 1986 to 1992 and the Maine Senate from 1992 to 1996. He lives in Paris, Maine.

Personal
Hanley first ran in 1986 for State Representative as a newcomer to politics. Originally from Paris, Maine, he graduated from Oxford Hills Comprehensive High School and Colby College. Prior to running, Hanley had been chair of the Paris Republican Committee for a year and a half.

References

Year of birth missing (living people)
Living people
People from Paris, Maine
Colby College alumni
Republican Party members of the Maine House of Representatives
Republican Party Maine state senators
Maine lawyers